Valkyrie is a rural locality in the Isaac Region, Queensland, Australia. In the  Valkyrie had a population of 122 people.

Geography 
The Isaac River passes through the locality forming part of the locality's south-western boundary. The Fitzroy Developmental Road passes through the locality from north to south.

The Duania open-cut coal mine is in the western part of the locality and is serviced by the Goonyella railway line. However, the land use of Valkyrie is predominantly cattle grazing.

History 
Valkyrie State School opened on 9 January 1974.

In 2011, there was a proposal to develop the Codrilla coal mine on a site approximately 800 metres from the school. The proposal included the relocation of the school and its teacher's residence to a new location to avoid any environmental impacts from the mine. As of 2017, the mine proposal and school relocation have not yet occurred.

In the  Valkyrie had a population of 122 people.

Education 
Valkyrie State School is a government primary (Early Childhood-6) school for boys and girls at 43092 Fitzroy Developmental Road.  In 2016, the school had an enrolment of 19 students with 2 teachers and 6 non-teaching staff (2 full-time equivalent). In 2018, the school had an enrolment of 22 students with 3 teachers (2 full-time equivalent) and 5 non-teaching staff (2 full-time equivalent).

Water supply issue
Valkyrie State School has become known for its ongoing struggle in attempting to obtain a permanent water supply since opening in 1974.

In 2015, a student suffered a broken arm after falling on the dry surface of the school's unwatered oval. Students were subsequently banned from playing on the oval to prevent similar incidents from occurring. Since June 2020, the school has been relying on a mining company Peabody Energy to transport potable water to supplement the school's rainwater tanks free of charge. The school's rainwater tanks ran out of water in May 2021.

In 2021, the school was banned by the state government from accepting donated water from any company apart from its own commercial business unit QBuild. The Parents & Citizens' Association, the Isolated Children's Parent's Association and local MP Dale Last have all criticised the state government's handling of the issue. The government was also criticised by the P&C for not allocating any money in the 2021 state budget to address the lack of water supply at Valkyrie State School, despite funding ten new schools in South East Queensland, and allocating money for new infrastructure at Parkhurst State School.

According to the Department of Education, an additional three new water tanks with ultraviolet filtration would be installed at the school in 2021.  However, the P&C said they would prefer a permanent water source and proposed that the school either be connected to the nearest pipeline or have a nearby dam rehabilitated so water could be pumped to the school from there.

References 

Isaac Region
Localities in Queensland